La Jard is a commune in the Charente-Maritime department in southwestern France.

Population

Geography
The river Seugne forms most of the commune's northeastern border.

See also
 Communes of the Charente-Maritime department

References

External links
 

Communes of Charente-Maritime
Charente-Maritime communes articles needing translation from French Wikipedia